A prefect (plural préfets) in France is the state's representative in a department or region. Subprefects (French: sous-préfets) are responsible for the subdivisions of departments, known as arrondissements. The office of a prefect is known as a prefecture and that of a subprefect as a subprefecture. Regional prefects are ex officio the departmental prefects of the regional prefecture.

Prefects are tasked with upholding the law in the department they serve in, including controlling the actions of local authorities to ensure adhesion to national guidelines. They are authorised to sue local collectivities in the name of the state.

Prefects are appointed by a decree of the President of France when presiding the Government's Council of Ministers, following a proposal by the Prime Minister and the Minister of the Interior. They serve at the Government's discretion and can be replaced at any meeting of the Council of Ministers.

From 1982 to 1988, under the Socialist administration of President François Mitterrand, prefects were called commissaires de la République (the Republic's commissioners) and subprefects commissaires adjoints de la République (the Republic's deputy commissioners).

Roles

The post of prefect was first created on 17 February 1800 by then-First Consul Napoléon Bonaparte.

Their roles were initially similar to those of the pre-revolutionary intendants. Prefects were initially charged with supervising local governments in their department, ensuring that taxes flowed to Paris and supervising conscription at the local level.

Currently, the main role of the prefect is defined in article 72 of the Constitution of France:

The exact role and attributions are defined in decrees, most notably decrees of 1964, 1982, 2004, each replacing the preceding one.

The prefect of the département containing the chef-lieu de région is also the préfet de région, or the prefect of the région.

Prefects operate under the minister of the interior. Their main missions include.
 representing the state to local governments;
 security
 the coordination of police and gendarmerie forces;
 handling major crises;
 emergency defence procedures;
 safety
 the decision to evacuate zones facing natural disasters; the organisation of relief operations;
 responsibility for official documents, such as
 the production of identity documents, including identity cards and passports;
 the issuing of driving licences, and their administrative withdrawal in case of certain offences;
 the application of immigration rules;
 ensuring respect for legality: officials working for the prefect verify the legality of decisions made by local governments and submit doubtful cases to administrative courts or to financial auditing courts.

Prefects may issue administrative orders in areas falling within the competency of the national government, including general safety. For instance, they may prohibit the use of certain roads without special tyres in times of snow. The prohibition on smoking or leaving the motor running while filling the fuel tank of a motor vehicle is another example of a matter typically decided by a prefectoral administrative order.

On official occasions, prefects wear uniforms.

For much of the time after 1800, the departments largely functioned as transmission belts for policies developed in Paris. As such, prefects originally had fairly extensive powers of supervision and control over departmental affairs. This was especially true during the Consulate and the First and Second Empires when even the most trivial local matter had to be referred to the prefect.  Since 1982, local government has been progressively decentralized, and the prefect's role has largely been limited to preventing local policies from conflicting with national policy.

Special cases
 In New Caledonia and French Polynesia, the prefect's roles, with certain differences in status, are fulfilled by a high commissioner; in Wallis and Futuna, by a superior administrator.
 The French Southern and Antarctic Lands used to be run by a superior administrator, but since 2004 are run by a prefect. The prefect, however, is not based in the territories, but in Réunion.
 Paris, which is both a city (commune) and a department, is an exception. While it has a prefect, who is also prefect of the Île-de-France region, another prefect handles law enforcement in Paris and some surrounding areas, as well many other administrative duties: the Prefect of Police of Paris. In Paris, the law enforcement powers exercised in other French cities and towns by the mayor belong to the Prefect of Police. In 2012, a Prefecture of Police of the Bouches-du-Rhône was also created, seated at Marseille, with similar powers.
 The authority of the state over the sea is exercised by the Maritime Prefect of the relevant region.

See also
 Prefect
 Subprefect
 Maritime prefect
 Prefectures in France

External links
  Decree of 14 March 1964, regarding the powers of prefects
  Decree of 10 May 1982, regarding the powers of prefects
  Decree of 29 April 2004, regarding the powers of prefects

References

 
French civil servants
Government occupations
Government of France